Good Vibrations is a 2013 comedy-drama film written by Colin Carberry and Glenn Patterson and directed by Lisa Barros D'Sa and Glenn Leyburn. It stars Richard Dormer, Jodie Whittaker, Adrian Dunbar, Liam Cunningham, Karl Johnson and Dylan Moran. It is based on the life of Terri Hooley, a record-store owner instrumental in developing Belfast's punk rock scene. The film was produced by Chris Martin, with Andrew Eaton, Bruno Charlesworth and David Holmes. Holmes also co-wrote the soundtrack score.

Plot
In 1970s sectarian Belfast in the midst of The Troubles, Terri Hooley (Dormer) is a DJ who opens a record shop "on the most bombed half-mile in Europe". He is a music-lover, idealist, radical and rebel. He is inspired by the new underground punk scene and in turn galvanises the young musicians, branching out into record production and bringing life to the city.

Cast
 Richard Dormer as Terri Hooley
 Jodie Whittaker as Ruth
 Michael Colgan as Dave Hyndman
 Karl Johnson as George Hooley
 Adrian Dunbar as Gang Leader
 Liam Cunningham as Studio Engineer
 Dylan Moran as Harp Owner
 Mark Ryder as Greg Cowen
 Killian Scott as Ronnie Matthews
 Phillip Taggart as Gordon Blair
 Diarmuid Noyes as Brian Young
 Andrew Simpson as Colin "Getty" Getgood
 Ryan McParland as Fangs
 Kerr Logan as Feargal Sharkey
 Demetri Goritsas as Paul McNally
 Chris Patrick-Simpson as Wolfgang Zorrer
 James Tolcher as Gang Member
 Paul Caddell as Ned
 John Travers as Mutt
 Niall Wright as Mickey Bradley
 Una Carroll as Mrs Sharkey (as Una Caryll)
 Dorian Dixon as Sazafrazz Bods
 Mark Asante as Soldier
 Niketa Ferguson as Beautiful German Girl
 Robert Render	as Roaring Executive
 Mary Lindsay as Marilyn
 Steven Donnelly as Rural Punker
 Emma Ryan as Girl
 Joseph Donnelly as Rural Hall Manager

Release
Good Vibrations was released on 29 March 2013, following showings at various film festivals.

Reception
Q magazine rated the film 5/5, while The Observer, The Guardian, The Independent and Time Out all gave extremely favourable 4/5 reviews, with much praise for Dormer's performance as Hooley. Observer film critic Mark Kermode described the film as "an absolute humdinger with real heart and soul" and later described how he was twice moved to tears watching it. Kermode subsequently named it the best film of 2013.

On Rotten Tomatoes the film has an approval rating of 94% based on reviews from 36 critics with an average rating of 6.9/10.

Accolades
The film was the winner of both the Galway Film Fleadh Audience Award and The Belfast Film Festival Audience Award and was nominated for three Irish Film and Television Awards including Best Film, Best Actor for Richard Dormer, and Costume for Maggie Donnelly, winning Best Costume. The film received the award for best script at the 2012 Dinard Festival. The screenplay of Good Vibrations received a BAFTA nomination.

Music
Much of the music is provided by bands released by the Good Vibrations label, such as "Big Time", "I Spy" and "The Pressure's On" by Rudi, "Self Conscious Over You", "Justa Nother Teenage Rebel" and "You're A Disease" by The Outcasts and "Teenage Kicks" by The Undertones, as well as Stiff Little Fingers, another Northern Irish punk band around at the same time but not released by the label. The soundtrack also includes songs by The Shangri-Las, Small Faces, David Bowie, Hank Williams and Suicide, among others.

References

External links
 

2013 films
2013 drama films
2013 biographical drama films
English-language Irish films
Northern Irish films
British biographical drama films
Films set in Belfast
Films set in the 1970s
Films scored by David Holmes (musician)
Films directed by Lisa Barros D'Sa and Glenn Leyburn
2010s English-language films
2010s British films